Bezobrazov was the name of the Russian noble family, whose members held significant positions within the Russian Empire.

History 
The family first appeared in written documents in the 15th century. They had numerous noble untitled branches and the branch of the family that held the title of Count Chernyshev-Bezobrazov.

Notable members 
 Aleksandr Aleksandrovich Bezobrazov (fl. 1914), army officer, aviator, aircraft designer
 Aleksandr Mikhailovich Bezobrazov (1783–1871), governor of St. Petersburg, Yaroslavl and Tambov
 Aleksandr Mikhailovich Bezobrazov (1855–1931), businessman and political adventurer
 Petr Bezobrazov (1845–1906), naval officer
 Vladimir Bezobrazov (1828–1889), economist